The Fencers Club in Midtown, Manhattan, New York City, is the oldest fencing club in the Western Hemisphere. It is a member of the Metropolitan Division of the U.S. Fencing Association.  Established in Manhattan in 1883, it has evolved into a 501(c)3 not-for-profit fencing organization dedicated to fencing and community service.  It has produced numerous National Champions and Olympians.

History
The Fencers Club was founded in 1883 by Charles de Kay and other New Yorkers. One had to be in the Social Register to be a member.  Its first fencing master was Captain Hippolyte Nicolas, a French officer who had fought in the Franco-Prussian War of 1870, who was partial to the Italian school of fencing.

In 1892 it had about 200 members. In 1902 annual dues at the club were $30 ($ in current dollar terms). In 1914, one third of its members were women. Rene Pinchart, a Belgian sergeant major in World War I, was fencing master at the club from 1927 to 1955. French-American Michel Alaux was fencing master of the club from 1956 until 1974.

In 2012, the Fencers Club became only the ninth organization to be recognized by the United States Olympic Committee (USOC) as a Community Olympic Development Program (CODP), for its innovative and world-class programs that embody the Olympic ideals.

The Fencers Club is located in the Midtown Manhattan neighborhood of Manhattan, New York City.  The facility includes 22 full-length metal grounded training strips with electronic scoring equipment, as well as an in-house pro shop and armory.

The Fencers Club is the birthplace and home of the Peter Westbrook Foundation.

Notable members

Albert Axelrod (1921-2004), 5x Olympian, Olympic bronze medalist
 Norman C. Armitage (1907, as Norman Cudworth Cohn–1972), 6x Olympian, Olympic bronze medalist
Robert Blum (born 1928), 2x Olympian
Daniel Bukantz (1917–2008), 4x Olympian
Miles Chamley-Watson (born 1989), 2x Olympian, bronze medalist
Abe Cohen (1924–2016), Olympian
Herb Cohen (born 1940), 2x Olympian
Emily Cross (born 1986), Olympian
Eugene Glazer (born 1939), Olympian
 Joel Glucksman (born 1949), Olympian
Harold Goldsmith (1930–2004), 3x Olympian
Emily Jacobson (born 1985), Olympian
Dan Kellner (born 1976), Olympian
Byron Krieger (1920–2015), 2x Olympian 
Nate Lubell (1916–2006), 3x Olympian
James Margolis (born 1936), Olympian
James Melcher (born 1939), Olympian
Tim Morehouse (born 1978), 3x Olympian
 Nickolas Muray (born Miklós Mandl; 1892-1965), Hungarian-born 2x Olympian
Nzingha Prescod (born 1992), 2x Olympian
Nicole Ross (born 1989), 2x Olympian
Keeth Smart (born 1978), Olympian, Olympic silver medalist
James Strauch (1921–1998), Olympian
Albert Strauss (1876-1963), Olympian
Jonathan Tiomkin (born 1979), Olympian
Peter Westbrook (born 1952), 4x Olympian, bronze medalist

See also

United States Fencing Association

References

External links

Fencing organizations
Fencing in the United States
Fencing clubs
Fencing venues
Sports clubs established in 1883
1883 establishments in New York (state)
Sports in Manhattan